The Type 052B (NATO/OSD Luyang I-class destroyer is a class of guided-missile destroyers in the Chinese People's Liberation Army Navy Surface Force (PLAN). The Type 052B was China's first modern destroyer design and the first Chinese design to incorporate true medium-range air defence capability in the form of Russian Shtil-1 (improved navalized Buk, NATO designation SA-N-12) surface-to-air missiles (SAM).

Two ships - Guangzhou and Wuhan - were built and commissioned in July 2004.

Programme 
In the early 2000's, China pursued multiple - and sometimes concurrent - programmes to acquire modern destroyers, purchasing s from Russia and constructing the Type 052B, Type 051C, and Type 052C. These ships also represented steps to develop adequate air defense capabilities by adopting Russian air defense technology.; the 25-km range Uragan (navalized Buk, NATO designation SA-N-7) on the Sovremenny; the 35-km range Shtil-1 on the Type 052B; long-range area air defense with the 150-km range Rif-M (navalized S-300, NATO designation SA-N-20) on the Type 051C; and finally the Chinese 100-km range HHQ-9 (S-300 derivative) on the Type 052D.

The Type 052B's air defence capabilities were obsolete upon entering service when compared to contemporary American and Japanese designs. Nonetheless it represented a considerable general improvement over previous Chinese warships and was the precursor to later Chinese air warfare destroyers.

Design 
The hull is based on the Type 051B destroyer with added stealth features.

Ships of Class

Gallery

See also
List of naval ship classes in service

References

Bibliography

Destroyer classes